Reginald Thomas Pollard (31 October 1894 – 24 August 1981) was an Australian politician. He was a member of the Australian Labor Party (ALP) and served in the Victorian Legislative Assembly (1924–1932) and House of Representatives (1937–1966). He was Minister for Commerce and Agriculture (1946–1949) in the Chifley Government.

Early life
Pollard was born in Castlemaine, Victoria and educated at Woodend State School, West Melbourne Technical School and Workingmen's College. He worked as an agricultural labourer near Werribee and from 1912 to 1915 as a fitter in Melbourne. During World War I he served in the first Australian Imperial Force the 6th Battalion from October 1915 in Egypt and France and was promoted to Second Lieutenant. He was wounded in 1918 and invalidated home. He became a soldier settler in Woodend as a dairy farmer. He married Elsie Bowman Hodges in 1922 and they had two sons.

State politics
Pollard founded the Woodend branch of the Australian Labor Party. He was elected to the Victorian Legislative Assembly seat of Dalhousie in a 1924 by-election, and represented the seat of Bulla and Dalhousie from 1927 until his defeat in the 1932 election. He was assistant Minister of Agriculture from December 1929 to May 1932. He ran unsuccessfully for the federal seat of Gippsland at the 1934 election and the state seat of Castlemaine and Kyneton in 1935.

Federal politics
Pollard was elected to the Australian House of Representatives seat of Ballaarat at the 1937 election and held it until the 1949 election, when he was elected as the member for Lalor. He was appointed Minister for Commerce and Agriculture in the second Chifley Ministry in November 1946, but lost office with the defeat of the Chifley government at the 1949 election. As Minister, he introduced a scheme to stabilise the price of wheat paid to farmers. He was defeated in Lalor at the 1966 election. He died in Gisborne.

Notes

Australian Labor Party members of the Parliament of Australia
Members of the Australian House of Representatives for Ballarat
Members of the Australian House of Representatives for Lalor
Members of the Australian House of Representatives
Members of the Cabinet of Australia
Members of the Victorian Legislative Assembly
1894 births
1981 deaths
20th-century Australian politicians
People from Castlemaine, Victoria
Australian military personnel of World War I